The sombre bat (Eptesicus tatei) is a species of vesper bat. It is found only in India. Its natural habitat is subtropical and tropical moist montane forests.

Sources

Eptesicus
Bats of India
Mammals described in 1951
Taxonomy articles created by Polbot